Čierna nad Tisou is a town and municipality in the Trebišov District in the Košice Region of extreme south-eastern Slovakia, near the Tisa (Tisza) river.

History
The town and municipality is one of the newest in the Košice Region established in 1828.

In 1968, from 29 July to 1 August, Soviet and Czechoslovak leaders Leonid Brezhnev and Alexander Dubček met in Čierna nad Tisou. This meeting was followed by the Warsaw Pact invasion of Czechoslovakia on 20 August 1968.

Geography
It has a population of about 3,500 people. It is close to the tripoint between Hungary, Ukraine and Slovakia.

Ethnicity
The town is about 60% Hungarian, 34% Slovak, 6% Ukrainian.

Economy and facilities
The town has a pharmacy, and outpatient health facilities of a general practitioner and children and adolescents. The town has a public library, gymnasium, a post office, and a number of general and food stores.

Transport

The town has a railway border crossing to Ukraine, where all trains have to change gauge. With 916 tracks this town is the biggest "harbour on land" in Central Europe. The first town across the border in Ukraine is Chop.

Twin towns – sister cities
Čierna nad Tisou is twinned with:

  Záhony, Hungary
  Ajak, Hungary 
  Chop, Ukraine

See also
 List of municipalities and towns in Slovakia

References

Genealogical resources
The records for genealogical research are available at the state archive "Statny Archiv in Kosice, Slovakia"

 Roman Catholic church records (births/marriages/deaths): 1719-1922 (parish B)
 Greek Catholic church records (births/marriages/deaths): 1795-1905 (parish B)
 Reformated church records (births/marriages/deaths): 1772-1889 (parish B)

External links
Official website
Surnames of living people in Cierna nad Tisou

Cities and towns in Slovakia
Villages and municipalities in Trebišov District
Slovakia–Ukraine border crossings
Hungarian communities in Slovakia